Aghbolagh (also Romanized as Āghbolāgh and Āgh Bolāgh) is a village in Mehranrud-e Jonubi Rural District, in the Central District of Bostanabad County, East Azerbaijan Province, Iran. At the 2006 census, its population was 393, in 72 families.

References 

Populated places in Bostanabad County